Row Data Gateway is a design pattern in which an object acts as a gateway to a single database row.

References

Software design patterns